Paris Josua Brunner (born 15 February 2006) is a German footballer who plays as a forward for Borussia Dortmund.

Club career
Brunner played for the academies of Rot-Weiss Essen and VfL Bochum, before joining Borussia Dortmund in 2020.

He rose to prominence in the footballing world after scoring sixteen goals in only five Under 17 Bundesliga appearances. He was promoted to the under-19 side at the age of sixteen, scoring on his debut against Bonner SC in the Under 19 Bundesliga. These goal-scoring feats earned him comparisons to teammate Youssoufa Moukoko, who was similarly prolific at youth level.

International career
Brunner has represented Germany at youth international level. He is also eligible to represent the Democratic Republic of the Congo.

References

2006 births
Living people
German people of Democratic Republic of the Congo descent
German sportspeople of Democratic Republic of the Congo descent
German footballers
Germany youth international footballers
Association football forwards
VfL Bochum players
Borussia Dortmund players